Michelle Kaufusi (born October 14, 1966) is an American politician serving as the 45th and current Mayor of Provo, Utah since 2017. She is a member of the Republican Party.

Early life and education 
Kaufusi was born and raised in Provo, Utah. Kaufusi is a member of the Church of Jesus Christ of Latter-day Saints. Her mother is also a member of the church, and father left the family when she was six. She graduated from Provo High, where she served in student government and earned an academic scholarship to BYU. She studied at Brigham Young University where she received a Bachelor of Science degree in Geography.

Career
After graduating from college, she moved to Pennsylvania to join her husband, who she had married a few months earlier, who was then playing for the Philadelphia Eagles. Her first two children were born in Pennsylvania. They then spent a few years in Salt Lake City while her husband studied at and coached at the University of Utah. They returned to Provo in 2002. Prior to her election as mayor, Kaufusi served as a member of the Provo School Board for six years.

On February 7, 2020, former Governor Jon Huntsman Jr. announced Kaufusi as his running mate in the 2020 Utah gubernatorial election. In the Republican primary, Huntsman was narrowly defeated by Spencer Cox.

Personal life

Kaufusi is married to Steve Kaufusi who was formerly the defensive line coach for Brigham Young University. Her son, Bronson Kaufusi, was a tight end for the Green Bay Packers while her other son, Corbin Kaufusi, played basketball and football at BYU and played for the San Francisco 49ers.

References

21st-century American politicians
Women mayors of places in Utah
Living people
Mayors of Provo, Utah
Brigham Young University alumni
Latter Day Saints from Utah
Utah Republicans
1966 births
21st-century American women politicians